Thomas Warner may refer to:

Sir Thomas Warner (explorer) (1580–1649), English explorer, and settler of St Kitts
Sir Courtenay Warner, 1st Baronet (Thomas Courtenay Theydon Warner, 1857–1934), British politician
Tom Warner (1948–2019), American politician
Tom Warner (activist) (born 1952), Canadian gay rights activist
Thomas Warner (poet) (born 1979), British poet
Thomas Warner (bobsleigh), British bobsledder
Thomas Warner (cricketer), South African cricketer